Emperor Yingzong of Song (16 February 1032 – 25 January 1067), personal name Zhao Shu, was the fifth emperor of the Song dynasty of China. His original personal name was Zhao Zongshi but it was changed to "Zhao Shu" in 1062 by imperial decree. He reigned from 1063 to his death in 1067. He was succeeded by his eldest son, Emperor Shenzong.

Family Background

Emperor Yingzong was the 13th son of Zhao Yunrang (趙允讓; 969–1059), who was a first cousin of Emperor Renzong and was posthumously known as "Prince Anyi of Pu". Emperor Yingzong's grandfather, Zhao Yuanfen (趙元份; 966–1005), was a younger brother of Emperor Renzong's father, Emperor Zhenzong, and was posthumously known as "Prince Gongjing of Shang". Emperor Yingzong's mother, whose maiden family name was Ren, was the concubine of Zhao Yunrang. She held the title "Xianjun of Xianyou".

Early life 
In 1055, Emperor Yingzong's predecessor, Emperor Renzong, became critically ill and started to worry about having no successor because his sons all died prematurely. Acting on the advice of his ministers, Emperor Renzong agreed to bring two of his younger male relatives into his palace. One of them was the future Emperor Yingzong, who was eventually chosen and designated as the Crown Prince. Yingzong had his name changed to "Zhao Shu" in 1062 when he was officially designated as the Crown Prince. This name became his official name when he ascended the throne in the following year after his adoptive father Emperor Renzong died in 1063.

Reign

Emperor Yingzong's empress consort was Empress Gao, a niece of Empress Dowager Cao who was the widow of Emperor Renzong. As Emperor Yingzong was severely sickly shortly after his coronation, Empress Dowager Cao served as his regent. However, Empress Dowager Cao held onto power even when Yingzong recovered until the Prime Minister Han Qi removed the screen from the audience hall making it impossible for Empress Dowager Cao to attend. She was forced to give power back to Yingzong.

Emperor Yingzong's reign is known for controversy over the correct rituals to be performed by the emperor for his father. Emperor Yingzong had been adopted by Emperor Renzong, so Emperor Renzong was nominally Emperor Yingzong's father. However, biologically, Zhao Yunrang was Emperor Yingzong's father. Some officials suggested that Emperor Yingzong honour his biological father with the title "Imperial Uncle", but the emperor agreed with Ouyang Xiu and others and decided to honour his biological father as his parent. This was not only an early sign of more conflict during Emperor Xiaozong's reign but also the Great Rites Controversy of the Ming dynasty.

On April 7, 1063, Yingzong sent gifts including calligraphy made by Emperor Renzong to the Vietnamese King Ly Thanh Tong. Later, Than Thieu Thai raided Guangnan West Circuit prompting local officials to seek help from Yingzong but he ignored them leaving defences up to them although he branded Than Thieu Thai as "reckless and mad.”

In 1065 AD, Emperor Yingzong ordered the great historian Sima Guang (1019–1086 AD) to lead with other scholars such as his chief assistants Liu Shu, Liu Ban and Fan Zuyu, the compilation of a universal history of China.

He died in 1067, caused by an illness that Yingzong contracted in 1066. He was succeeded by his son Zhao Xu who took the throne name Emperor Shenzong.

Emperor Yingzong had always been mentally ill, often distracted, physically weak, and depressed causing him to have health problems which contributed to his death at a young age.

Family
Consorts and Issue:
 Empress Xuanren, of the Gao clan (1032–1093)
 Zhao Xu, Shenzong (1048–1085), first son
 Zhao Hao, Prince Wurong (1050–1096), second son
 Princess Xianhui (1051–1080), second daughter
 Married Wang Shen (1036–1093), and had issue (one son)
 Princess Xiande (1051–1123), third daughter
 Married Zhang Dunli (d. 1107) in 1068, and had issue (one son, one daughter)
 Zhao Yan, Prince Run, third son
 Zhao Yun, Prince Yiduanxian (1056–1088), fourth son
Zhaoyi, of the Bao clan (昭儀 鮑氏)
Xiurong, of the Zhang clan (张修容)
Guiyi, of the Zhang clan (贵仪张氏)
Cairen, of the Yang clan (才人杨氏)
 Unknown
 Princess Hehui (d. 1085), first daughter
 Married Wang Shiyue in 1066
 Princess Zhenjing
 Married Xu Jue, and had issue (two sons)

Ancestry

See also
 Chinese emperors family tree (middle)
 List of emperors of the Song dynasty
 Architecture of the Song dynasty
 Culture of the Song dynasty
 Economy of the Song dynasty
 History of the Song dynasty
 Society of the Song dynasty
 Technology of the Song dynasty

References

 Anderson, James A. (2008). "'Treacherous Factions': Shifting Frontier Alliances in the Breakdown of Sino-Vietnamese Relations on the Eve of the 1075 Border War", in Battlefronts Real and Imagined: War, Border, and Identity in the Chinese Middle Period, 191–226. Edited by Don J. Wyatt. New York: Palgrave MacMillan. .

 

1032 births
1067 deaths
Northern Song emperors
11th-century Chinese monarchs
People from Kaifeng